SARTS or Sarts can have several meanings:

 Singapore Amateur Radio Transmitting Society
 Sarts, a group of Central Asian people